Herbert Reinecker (24 December 1914 – 27 January 2007) was a very prolific German novelist, dramatist, screenwriter and former Nazi SS officer.

Career
Born in Hagen, Westphalia, Reinecker began to write short stories already as a high school student. In 1936 he moved to Berlin, where he became editor-in-chief of a youth magazine, Jungvolk. In the same year he also co-authored a book, Jugend in Waffen (Armed Youth). This was a time when the Nazis had already been in power for three years and when the media had long been gleichgeschaltet. In 1943 he joined the Nazi Party and worked as the editor-in-chief of a book entitled Der Pimpf about the training system of the Hitler Youth. Throughout World War II Reinecker served in a propaganda company of the Waffen SS.

In the early 1940s Reinecker also wrote a number of plays, among them Das Dorf bei Odessa, and the novel Der Mann mit der Geige. In 1944 he wrote an award-winning screenplay, Junge Adler (Young Eagles).

After the war, he started working for radio and television. At the same time he wrote screenplays for the series of German feature films of the 1960s that were loosely based on Edgar Wallace's novels as well as TV adaptations of Francis Durbridge novels and plays.

In the late 1960s, Reinecker and producer Helmut Ringelmann wanted to create a truly German police detective. At first tentatively conceived as a "German Maigret", Reinecker's Kommissar Keller soon metamorphosed into a full-fledged character. Erik Ode was chosen to play Keller in the TV series, Der Kommissar, which was finally launched in 1969 and which became a huge success. In 1974, Reinecker and Ringelmann started a new, similar series, Derrick which was in production until 1998 with mayor international success.

Personal life
In 1938 Herbert Reinecker married Angela Schmikowski, with whom he had two children – daughter Rita (also a writer/author), 1941, and Hilmar (1944–2001). Divorced in 1954, he married Brunhilde (Holly) Schubert in 1959.

Reinecker is reported to have stopped writing due to macular degeneration. He was nearly blind when he died on 27 January 2007, aged 92.

Selected filmography
 The Rainer Case (1942, based on his novel Der Mann mit der Geige)
 Father Needs a Wife (1952)
 I and You (1953)
 Canaris (1954)
 Heaven Is Never Booked Up (1955)
 Children, Mother, and the General (1955)
 Alibi (1955)
 Der Stern von Afrika (1957)
 The Fox of Paris (1957)
 Taiga (1958)
 The Trapp Family in America (1958)
  (1958)
 People in the Net (1959)
 Dorothea Angermann (1959)
 An Alibi for Death (1963)
 The River Line (1964)
 Der Hexer (1964)
 Man Called Gringo (1965)
 I Am Looking for a Man (1966)
 Maigret and His Greatest Case (1966)
 The Hunchback of Soho (1966)
 Murderers Club of Brooklyn (1967)
 The Monk with the Whip (1967)
  (1967, TV miniseries)
 The Valley of Death (1968)
 The Hound of Blackwood Castle (1968)
  (1968, TV miniseries)
 Der Kommissar (1969–1976, TV series, 96 episodes)
 11 Uhr 20 (1970, TV miniseries)
 Under the Roofs of St. Pauli (1970)
  (1970)
 The Girl from Hong Kong (1973)
 Crime After School (1975)
 Derrick (1974–1998, TV series; 281 episodes)

References

External links
 

1914 births
2007 deaths
People from Hagen
People from the Province of Westphalia
Nazi Party members
German television writers
Male television writers
German male screenwriters
German male novelists
Mass media people from North Rhine-Westphalia
20th-century German novelists
20th-century German male writers
Waffen-SS personnel
20th-century German screenwriters